Mark Easter (born 19 October 1982 in Mbabane, Swaziland) is a retired rugby union footballer who played at No. 8 or Flanker for Sale Sharks and Northampton Saints. He is the brother of former Harlequins and England player Nick Easter.

Mark is a former pupil of Dulwich College and was a member of the winning Old Alleynian 2003 team.

On Tuesday 8 March 2011, Sale Sharks announced that he had signed a two-year contract to play for them from the 2011–12 season.

External links
Northampton profile

References

1982 births
Living people
People educated at Dulwich College
Alumni of the University of Nottingham
English rugby union players
Rugby union number eights
Nottingham R.F.C. players
Northampton Saints players
Sale Sharks players
People from Mbabane